Paaliaq is a prograde irregular satellite of Saturn. It was discovered by J. J. Kavelaars, Brett J. Gladman, Jean-Marc Petit, Hans Scholl, Matthew J. Holman, Brian G. Marsden, Philip D. Nicholson and Joseph A. Burns in early October 2000, and given the temporary designation S/2000 S 2. It was named in August 2003 after a fictional shaman in the book The Curse of the Shaman, written by Michael Kusugak, who supplied Kavelaars with the names of giants from Inuit mythology that were used for other Saturnian moons.

Paaliaq is thought to be about 22 kilometres in diameter, and orbits Saturn at an average distance of 15.2 million km in 687 days. It is a member of the Inuit group of irregular satellites. It also has a proximity with 9 other moons reaching up to ten miles from each.

It is light red in color, and in the infrared the Paaliapian (Paaliaqan) spectrum is very similar to the Inuit-group satellites Kiviuq and Siarnaq, supporting the thesis of a possible common origin of the Inuit group in the break-up of a larger body. Its light curve has an unusual pattern of four minima, suggesting that it has a very peculiar shape.

References 

Ephemeris IAU-MPC NSES

External links 

David Jewitt pages
Scott Sheppard pages

Inuit group
Moons of Saturn
Irregular satellites
Discoveries by Brett J. Gladman
Astronomical objects discovered in 2000
Moons with a prograde orbit